Upper Hutt College is a state co-educational secondary school located in Trentham in the city of Upper Hutt, New Zealand. The school opened in 1962 as the city's second state secondary school, supplementing Heretaunga College in Wallaceville.

Houses
The students are arbitrarily divided into four houses, each which have received their name from a famous New Zealander as voted by the student body in 2004. Each house also has their own set colour which is used at house events (for example Athletics Day) so each student can comfortably represent their house, and it also encourages artificial division within the school.

 Blake (Sir Peter Blake, Red)
 Hillary (Sir Edmund Hillary, Yellow/Gold)
 Jackson (Sir Peter Jackson, Green)
 Te Kanawa (Dame Kiri Te Kanawa, Blue)

BYOD (Bring Your Own Device) at UHC

Upper Hutt College started encouraging students to bring their own devices to school in 2015, when student Wi-Fi was set up.

Fire 
On the evening of 1 September 2019, a fire was started in one of the classrooms in the technology block, the fire quickly got out of control. A number of firefighters and units spent hours getting it under control. Nobody was harmed during the fire.

The school ended up being closed for a number of weeks, due to safety concerns raising from the fire. Asbestos was discovered in the damaged building and had to be removed safely. The main power cable that brought power into the school was under the building that was destroyed, work had to be carried out to make sure there was no damage to cables. The junior school was broken up, and spread out to two different sites so that teaching and learning could be carried on.

Two people were arrested for arson.

Notable alumni

Ray Ahipene-Mercer - Wellington City councillor 
Rebecca Kitteridge - Director of Security for the Security Intelligence Service (SIS)
Sika Manu - Professional rugby league footballer

References

External links
 School website
 

Educational institutions established in 1962
Secondary schools in the Wellington Region
Schools in Upper Hutt
New Zealand secondary schools of Nelson plan construction
1962 establishments in New Zealand